This is a list of adult nonfiction books that topped The New York Times Nonfiction Best Seller list in 1987.

See also

 1987 in literature
 New York Times Fiction Best Sellers of 1987
 Lists of The New York Times Fiction Best Sellers
 Publishers Weekly list of bestselling novels in the United States in the 1980s

References

1987
.
1987 in the United States